Heta is a conventional name for the historical Greek alphabet letter Eta (Η) and several of its variants, when used in their original function of denoting the consonant .

Overview
The letter Η had been adopted by Greek from the Phoenician letter Heth originally with this consonantal sound value, and Hēta was its original name. The Italic alphabets, and ultimately Latin, adopted the letter H from this Greek usage. However, Greek dialects progressively lost the sound  from their phonological systems. In the Ionic dialects, where this loss of  happened early, the name of the letter naturally changed to Ēta, and the letter was subsequently turned from a consonant to a new use as a vowel, denoting the long half-open  sound. In this function it later entered the classical orthography adopted across the whole of Greece. According to traditional accounts, the new vowel, Ēta, was originally the innovation of the poet Simonides of Ceos (556-468 BC). 

In dialects that still had the  sound as part of their phonological systems, including early Athens, the same letter continued to be used in its consonantal function. Just like vocalic Eta, it could occur in a number of glyph variants in different local varieties of the alphabet, including one shaped like a square "8" similar to the original Phoenician, but also a plain square, a crossed square, shapes with two horizontal or with diagonal bars.

During the classical era, more dialects adopted the new Ionian vocalic Eta (as Athens did around c. 400 BC). As many of these dialects nevertheless still also pronounced , they faced the problem of distinguishing between their own old consonantal symbol and the new vocalic symbol. Some dialects, including classical Attic, simply omitted the marking of the -sound. In others (for instance Rhodes), the same symbol was used in both functions.

From scholia to the grammar of Dionysius Thrax, it appears that the memory of the former consonantal value of the letter Η was still alive in the era of the Alexandrine Koiné insofar as the name of the vocalic η was still pronounced "heta" and accordingly written with a rough breathing. The later standard spelling of the name eta, however, has the smooth breathing.

Under the Roman emperor Claudius in the mid-1st century AD, Latin briefly re-borrowed the letter in the shape of the half-H tack glyph, as one of the so-called Claudian letters. It denoted the sonus medius, a short close vowel sound of a quality between i and u.

In modern transcriptions and editions of ancient Greek epigraphic text that use consonantal Heta, in any of its shapes, the letter is most often rendered simply with a Latin h, both in Latin transliteration and in Greek scholarly transcriptions (using lowercase in Greek, so that Latin h and Greek η are distinct). Some authors have also adopted the Heracleian "tack" Heta for use in modern transcription. Jeffery (1961) uses the tack symbol also as a modern label for the abstract grapheme, i.e. as a cover label for any letter shape denoting  in any given local alphabet.

Computer encoding

The Unicode standard of computer encoding introduced code points for a tack-shaped "Greek letter Heta" designed for this usage in its version 5.1 of April 2008. Like other archaic letters, Unicode Heta comes in an uppercase and lowercase variant to cater for the needs of modern typography. Type designers have created several designs for this new typographic lowercase form, one of them resembling a lowercase Latin h with a straight rightward horizontal bar. The Greek Heta codepoints are distinct from another set designed to represent the tack-shaped Claudian "Latin letter half H" (Latin Extended-C).

See also
Turnstile (symbol) (Similar looking glyphs)

References

Greek letters